Tiémoko Sangaré (born 1957) is a Malian politician. He serves as the Malian Minister of Mines.

References

Government ministers of Mali
Place of birth missing (living people)
1957 births
Living people
21st-century Malian people
Date of birth missing (living people)